The 1999 Family Circle Cup doubles was the doubles event of the twenty-seventh edition of the tennis tournament played at Hilton Head, United States. It is the third WTA Tier I tournament of the year, and part of the US Spring tennis season. Conchita Martínez and Patricia Tarabini were the defending champions but lost in the second round to Silvia Farina and Corina Morariu.

Elena Likhovtseva and Jana Novotná won in the final 6–1, 6–4 against Barbara Schett and Patty Schnyder.

Seeds
The top four seeded teams received byes into the second round.

Draw

Finals

Top half

Bottom half

External links
 1999 Family Circle Cup Doubles draw

Family Circle Cup
Charleston Open